Lithuanian broadcaster LRT announced their participation for Junior Eurovision Song Contest 2011 in September 2011. The National Final, "Vaiku Eurovizija" chose Paulina Skrabytė to represent Lithuania in the Junior Eurovision Song Contest 2011.

Before Junior Eurovision

Vaikų Eurovizijos nacionalinė atranka 
The final was held on 18 September 2011 at the LRT TV Studios in Vilnius, where 11 participants competed. The winner was chosen in two rounds of voting. In the first round the top 3 were chosen by televoting (50%) & a seven-member "expert" jury (50%), while in the second round the winner was chosen by the "expert" jury.

The jury that voted in the final included Jonas Vilimas, Asta Einikytė, Eglė Nepaitė, Donatas Montvydas, Artūras Novikas, Edmundas Seilius and Kristina Zmailaitė.

At Junior Eurovision

Voting

Notes

References

Junior Eurovision Song Contest
Junior
Lithuania